Robert Krasny from the University of Michigan, was awarded the status of Fellow in the American Physical Society, after they were nominated by their Division of Fluid Dynamics in 2007, for "his many achievements in advancing particle methods and tree-code algorithms to allow exceptionally precise computations of vortex dynamics, and his insightful use of the resulting methods to increase the fundamental understanding of regular and chaotic phenomena in fluid flows."
In 2012 he became one of the inaugural fellows of the American Mathematical Society.

References 

Fellows of the American Physical Society
American physicists
Living people
Date of death missing
Fellows of the American Mathematical Society
University of Michigan faculty
Year of birth missing (living people)